The LB&SCR D2 class, 0-4-2 suburban passenger locomotives, were designed by William Stroudley of the London Brighton and South Coast Railway in 1876. They were developed from his successful "D-tank" class of 1873.

Pre-Grouping

The 14 locomotives in this class were built at Brighton railway works and appeared in traffic between September 1876 and October 1883, intended for those duties where the limited water supply of a "D-tank" might prove to be a handicap. They were frequently employed on lightly loaded fast continental boat trains between London and Newhaven, and so were named after European cities. Thus they were frequently known as the "Lyons Class", after the first locomotive No.300 Lyons.

The class performed well for a quarter of a century, and achieved good mileages but when they began to require major repairs, it was decided to withdraw the class and use the newer B2 and C2 class locomotives in their place. The first two locomotives were withdrawn in November 1902 and the final two in March 1907. No examples survived into preservation.

Locomotive summary

Sources

 Bradley, D.L. (1972) The locomotives of the London, Brighton & South Coast Railway: Part 2, The Railway Correspondence and Travel Society, 
 Searle, David The London, Brighton & South Coast Railway https://web.archive.org/web/20080706131235/http://www.lbscr.demon.co.uk/locos/D2.html

0-4-2 locomotives
D2
Railway locomotives introduced in 1876
Scrapped locomotives
Standard gauge steam locomotives of Great Britain